Supriyo Dutta is an Indian Bengali language film and theatre actor from West Bengal. He is prominently known for his comic roles in Tollywood industry. He has started his career as a background artist in Indian Bengali film and established himself as an iconic personality.

Filmography

References

External links 
 Supriyo Dutta IMDb

Living people
Year of birth missing (living people)
Bengali actors
Bengali male actors
Male actors in Bengali cinema
Actors from Kolkata